AB-PINACA is a compound that was first identified as a component of synthetic cannabis products in Japan in 2012.

It was originally developed by Pfizer in 2009 as an analgesic medication.

AB-PINACA acts as a potent agonist for the CB1 receptor (Ki = 2.87 nM, EC50 = 1.2 nM) and CB2 receptor (Ki = 0.88 nM, EC50 = 2.5 nM) and fully substitutes for Δ9-THC in rat discrimination studies, while being 1.5x more potent.

There have been a number of reported cases of deaths and hospitalizations in relation to this synthetic cannabinoid.

Legal status

Germany
AB-PINACA is an Anlage II controlled substance in Germany as of November 2014.

Singapore
It is listed in the Fifth Schedule of the Misuse of Drugs Act and so is illegal in Singapore, as of May 2015.

United States
It is a Schedule I controlled substance in the United States.

China
It is a controlled substance in China as of October 2015.

France
It is a controlled substance in France as of March 2017.

See also 

 5F-AB-PINACA
 5F-ADB
 5F-AMB
 5F-APINACA
 5F-CUMYL-PINACA
 AB-CHFUPYCA
 AB-FUBINACA
 AB-PICA
 ADB-CHMINACA
 ADB-FUBINACA
 ADB-PINACA
 ADBICA
 APICA
 APINACA
 MDMB-CHMICA
 PX-3

References 

Cannabinoids
Designer drugs

Indazolecarboxamides
CB1 receptor agonists
CB2 receptor agonists